Pandit Prabhakar Karekar (b 1944) is a Hindustani classical vocalist, born in Goa, India. He was awarded Tansen Samman in 2014 and Sangeet Natak Akademi Award in the year 2016.

Background

Prabhakar Janardan Karekar was born in 1944, in what was then Portuguese Goa. His Hindustani vocal music training came from Suresh Haldankar, Jitendra Abhisheki, and C. R. Vyas. He has been known as an outstanding performer and teacher, and is a graded artist of All India Radio and Doordarshan.

Promoting Hindustani vocals

Karekar is also the founder and Chairman of the Swarprabha Trust. Karekar has trained several promising and accomplished young musicians. He has many recordings to his credit and has performed, lectured and held workshops or taken part in conferences in many countries.

Fusion music

He entered the world of fusion music with Ornette Coleman (U.S.A.), and Sultan Khan (India). The Sangeet Natak Akademi Award was for his contribution to Hindustani vocal music.

See also

 Shakuntala Bharne,who wrote his biography.

References

External links
 ̽Prabhakar Karekar songs
 Prabhakar Karekar on MyHeritage
 Prabhakar Karekar on Saregama.com
 On Aathavanitli-Gani.com

20th-century Indian musicians
Hindustani singers
Musicians from Mumbai
Recipients of the Sangeet Natak Akademi Award
People from Mapusa
People from North Goa district
 
Konkani people
Musicians from Goa